This is a list of the counties in the U.S. state of Montana. There are 56 counties in the state.

Montana has two consolidated city-counties—Anaconda with Deer Lodge County and Butte with Silver Bow County.  The portion of Yellowstone National Park that lies within Montana was not part of any county until 1978, when part of it was nominally added to Gallatin County, and the rest of it to Park County.

Montana's postal abbreviation is MT and its FIPS state code is 30.

Counties
The Federal Information Processing Standard (FIPS) code, which is used by the United States government to uniquely identify counties, is provided for each county. The FIPS code for each county links to census data for that county.

|}

Previous counties
St. Charles County, Missouri Territory created October 1, 1812, moved 1813
Vancouver County, Oregon Territory created August 13, 1848, renamed Clarke County, Oregon Territory September 3, 1849
Clarke County, Washington Territory created March 2, 1853
Walla Walla County, Washington Territory April 25, 1854
Spokane County, Washington Territory created January 29, 1858, abolished January 19, 1864
Missoula County, Washington Territory created December 14, 1860, abolished May 26, 1864
Shoshone County, Washington Territory created January 9, 1861, abolished March 3, 1863
Stevens County, Washington Territory created January 20, 1863
Shoshone County, Idaho Territory created February 4, 1864

Extinct counties
Edgerton County, Montana Territory created February 2, 1865, renamed Lewis and Clark County, Montana Territory March 1, 1868.
Big Horn County, Montana Territory created February 2, 1865, renamed Custer County, Montana Territory February 16, 1877.

County equivalents 
Yellowstone National Park (Montana Territory) created March 1, 1872, divided between Park County, Montana and Gallatin County, Montana in 1978.

See also
History of Montana
Bibliography of Montana history
Territorial evolution of Montana
Timeline of Montana history
List of cities and towns in Montana
List of ghost towns in Montana
List of places in Montana

References

Montana
List
Counties